Benton Township is a township in Butler County, Kansas, USA.  As of the 2000 census, its population was 2,211.

History
Benton Township was organized in 1872. It was named for Thomas Benton Murdock, a state politician.

Geography
According to the USGS, it contains three cemeteries: Benton, Indianola and Old Benton.

Transportation
Benton Township contains one airport or landing strip, Benton Airport.

See also
List of Kansas townships

Further reading

References

 USGS Geographic Names Information System (GNIS)

External links
 City-Data.com

Townships in Butler County, Kansas
Townships in Kansas